Alloxylon is a genus of four species in the family Proteaceae of mainly small to medium-sized trees. They are native to the eastern coast of Australia, with one species, A. brachycarpum found in New Guinea and the Aru Islands. The genus is a relatively new creation, being split off from Oreocallis. The name is derived from Ancient Greek allo- "other" or "strange" and xylon or "wood" due to their unusual cell architecture compared with the related genera Telopea and Oreocallis. In Australia, they are known as tree waratahs due to similarities in the inflorescences between them and the closely related Telopea.

Classification
Together with Telopea, Oreocallis and Embothrium, Alloxylon makes up a small group of terminal often red-flowering showy plants scattered around the southern edges of the Pacific Rim. Known as the subtribe Embothriinae, this is an ancient group with roots in the mid Cretaceous, when Australia, Antarctica and South America were linked by land.

Cultivation
They are grown for their incredibly showy flowers. Their large size and, in some cases, lengthy time to flower from seed, has limited their availability as garden plants. However Alloxylon flammeum has proven adaptable and hardy, while the others are more exacting in their requirements. All do best in a well-drained soil rich in organic material but low in phosphorus
with some shelter when small.

Species
 Alloxylon brachycarpum 
 Alloxylon flammeum  (type species) (previously Oreocallis wickhamii)
 Alloxylon pinnatum 
 Alloxylon wickhamii

References

External links
Photo of A. pinnatum in flower

 
Proteaceae genera
Ornamental trees
Taxa named by Michael Crisp
Australasian realm flora
Proteales of Australia